"Lord Above" is a song by American rappers Fat Joe and Dre featuring fellow American rapper Eminem and American singer Mary J. Blige released from the former two's collaborative studio album Family Ties on December 6, 2019 via RNG (Rap's New Generation) and EMPIRE. The song was produced by 808 Ray and Cool & Dre. Despite never being released as a single, the song has managed to peak at number 97 on the Billboard Hot 100 and number 44 on the Hot R&B/Hip-Hop Songs in the US.

To promote the album, Fat Joe billed his Eminem collaboration as "the most disrespectful song". In his verse, Eminem disses Nick Cannon and Mariah Carey, rapping: "I know me and Mariah didn't end on a high note / But that other dude's whipped, that pussy got him neutered / Tried to tell him this chick's a nut job before he got his jewels clipped / Almost got my caboose kicked, fool, quit, you not gon' do shit / I let her chop my balls off, too 'fore I lost to you, Nick". On December 9, 2019, Cannon responded with a diss track "The Invitation" featuring Hitman Holla, Charlie Clips and Prince Eazy, whom Cannon referred to as "The Black Squad" and Suge Knight. After Eminem responded to Cannon with two tweets, Cannon released a second diss track the next day featuring the same rappers as well as Conceited titled "Pray For Him", followed by another solo diss track entitled "The Invitation Canceled".

Personnel
Andre "Dre" Lyon – main artist, vocals, producer, songwriter
Joseph Cartagena – main artist, vocals, songwriter
Marshall Mathers – featured artist, vocals, songwriter
Mary J. Blige – featured artist, vocals, songwriter
Marcello Valenzano – producer, songwriter
Rayshon Cobbs Jr. – producer, songwriter

Charts

References

2019 songs
Diss tracks
Eminem songs
Fat Joe songs
Cool & Dre songs
Mary J. Blige songs
Songs written by Eminem
Songs written by Fat Joe
Songs written by Mary J. Blige
Song recordings produced by Cool & Dre
Songs written by Dre (record producer)
Songs written by Cool (record producer)